Arrow Supermarkets was an Australian supermarket chain, which operated until the early 1990s.

Arrow was marketed as a discount supermarket and were often located in neighbourhood shopping centres also incorporating shops such as Target discount department store, Red Apple Restaurant, and a number of specialty shops.

Defunct supermarkets of Australia
Australian grocers